Saurabh Dubey (born 23 January 1998) is an Indian cricketer. In November 2019, he was named in India's squad for the 2019 ACC Emerging Teams Asia Cup in Bangladesh. He made his List A debut for India, against Nepal, in the Emerging Teams Cup on 14 November 2019. In February 2022, he was bought by the Sunrisers Hyderabad in the auction for the 2022 Indian Premier League tournament.

References

External links
 

1998 births
Living people
Indian cricketers
Place of birth missing (living people)